Doyne is a surname. Notable people with the surname include:

Cory Doyne (born 1981), Major League Baseball pitcher who is currently in the Washington Nationals organization
John Doyne (1912–1997), Wisconsin politician and the first County Executive of Milwaukee County, Wisconsin
Maggie Doyne (born 1987), American philanthropist who has built an orphanage, women's centre and school in the Kopila Valley of Nepal
Philip Doyne (1886–1959), British fencer
Robert Walter Doyne (1857–1916), British ophthalmologist
Sir Robert Doyne (1651–1733), member of the Irish House of Commons, and later a distinguished judge

Geoffrey Doyne Adams KCMG OBE (born 1957), member of the British Diplomatic Service
J. Doyne Farmer (born 1952), American physicist and entrepreneur, with interests in chaos theory, complexity and econophysics

 William Thomas Doyne,  engineer (1822-1877) was an Irish engineer who was active in the Crimean War

See also
O Doyne manuscript, collection of material relating to a dispute among the Gaelic-Irish family of Ó Duinn
Ardoyne
Dyne
Oyne